Elof Westergaard (born 31 March 1962 in Lemvig) is a Danish theologian who since 2014 has been a Bishop of Ribe.

Priest
After graduating in theology from Aarhus University in 1991, he was ordained as a priest in Ribe Cathedral . He served as the vicar of Husby and Sønder Nissum parishes in the Diocese of Ribe during the period 1991-2005. From 2005 to 2014 he was pastor of Mariehøj Sogn and 2009-2014 also Dean of Silkeborg deanery.

Bishop
When Elisabeth Dons Christensen retired as Bishop of Ribe in 2014, Elof Westergaard announced his candidacy for the post. At the beginning of April 2014, he was elected as the new bishop of Ribe against three other candidates in 1st grade. He collected 64.35% of the votes. On June 1 that year he was consecrated and installed as bishop in Ribe Cathedral.

Bibliography
Opstandelsens billeder (2005)
Sten over Muld (2009)
Det blændende lys (2012)

References

21st-century Lutheran bishops
Danish Lutheran bishops
Living people
1962 births
Danish Lutheran theologians
People from Lemvig